Degrees of Connection is a 2004 Ned Kelly Award-winning novel by the Australian author Jon Cleary. It was the 20th and last entry in the Scobie Malone series. Cleary decided to stop writing crime novels because he felt he was getting stale.

Synopsis
Scobie Malone has been promoted from inspector to superintendent, while Russ Clements is now head of Homicide. He investigates the murder of the personal assistant to Natalie Shipwood, the CEO of development company Orlando. Malone's son, Tom, seems to have impregnated a girlfriend who is subsequently murdered and his daughter Maureen is an ABC journalist covering the Securities Commission investigation into Orlando.

Awards
Ned Kelly Awards for Crime Writing, Best Novel, 2004: winner

Notes
Dedication: "For Joy (1922–2003)".

References

External links
Degrees of Connection at AustLit (subscription required)
Review at Australian Book Review, May 2004

Australian crime novels
2003 Australian novels
Ned Kelly Award-winning works
Novels set in Sydney
HarperCollins books
Novels by Jon Cleary